The canton of Civray is an administrative division of the Vienne department, western France. Its borders were modified at the French canton reorganisation which came into effect in March 2015. Its seat is in Civray.

It consists of the following communes:
 
Asnois
Availles-Limouzine
Blanzay
Champagné-le-Sec
Champagné-Saint-Hilaire
Champniers
La Chapelle-Bâton
Charroux
Chatain
Château-Garnier
Civray
La Ferrière-Airoux
Genouillé
Joussé
Linazay
Lizant
Magné
Mauprévoir
Payroux
Pressac
Saint-Gaudent
Saint-Macoux
Saint-Martin-l'Ars
Saint-Pierre-d'Exideuil
Saint-Romain
Saint-Saviol
Savigné
Sommières-du-Clain
Surin
Voulême

References

Cantons of Vienne